Carlo Ceresoli (14 June 1910 – 22 April 1995) was an Italian football goalkeeper.

Club career
Born in Bergamo, Ceresoli played club football in the Italian Serie B with Atalanta, and in the Serie A with Inter Milan, Bologna, Genoa and Juventus.

International career
Ceresoli was considered one of the strongest Italian goalkeepers of the 1930s along with Gianpiero Combi & Aldo Olivieri. With the Italy national team he played the only qualifying match of the 1934 FIFA World Cup against Greece, and the famous Battle of Highbury against England, in which he saved a penalty from Eric Brook.
As Gianpiero Combi retired from football after the 1934 World Cup, Ceresoli got to start the last three matches of the 1933-35 Central European International Cup. Winning his first tournament with the Italy national team.
He also won the 1938 World Cup with the Italy national team, as a back up for Aldo Olivieri, and went on to win a total of 8 caps for Italy.

Honours

International 
Italy
 FIFA World Cup: 1938
 Central European International Cup: 1933–35

References

External links
Profile at enciclopediadelcalcio.it 
Profile at FIGC.it 

1910 births
1995 deaths
Footballers from Bergamo
Italian footballers
Italy international footballers
Association football goalkeepers
Serie A players
Atalanta B.C. players
Inter Milan players
Bologna F.C. 1909 players
Genoa C.F.C. players
Juventus F.C. players
1938 FIFA World Cup players
FIFA World Cup-winning players
Italian football managers
Atalanta B.C. managers